Vijay Hansda is an Indian politician and a member of the  Lok Sabha. He represents the Rajmahal constituency of Jharkhand and a member of the Jharkhand Mukti Morcha. Vijay is son of former Congress MP and former Congress State (Jharkhand) President Late Thomas Hansda from the same seat. Vijay joined the JMM fold just before the poll dates were announced.

External links
 Home Page on the Parliament of India's. In India

References

Living people
S
Jharkhand Mukti Morcha politicians
Lok Sabha members from Jharkhand
People from Pakur district
People from Sahibganj district
1982 births
India MPs 2019–present